Raymond Alexander Deans (born 24 January 1966) is a Scottish retired footballer.

A former pupil of Stonelaw High School in Rutherglen, Deans started his career as an apprentice with Chelsea before moving back to Scotland in 1983. He made his Clyde debut aged 17 under manager Craig Brown, and went on to score 14 league goals for the club in two years, before transferring to Doncaster Rovers for a fee of £40,000. He only spent a season there, as injury forced him to retire in 1986, aged only 20.

References

External links

Living people
1966 births
Scottish footballers
Clyde F.C. players
Doncaster Rovers F.C. players
Scottish Football League players
English Football League players
Scotland youth international footballers
Association football forwards
Sportspeople from Lanark
People educated at Stonelaw High School
Footballers from South Lanarkshire